Rockchuck Peak is located in the Teton Range, Grand Teton National Park in the U.S. state of Wyoming. The mountain is immediately west of String Lake and south of Paintbrush Canyon.

References

Mountains of Grand Teton National Park
Mountains of Wyoming
Mountains of Teton County, Wyoming